Oldest city could refer to:

 Historical urban community sizes
 List of oldest continuously inhabited cities
 List of largest cities throughout history